The 1994 Senior British Open was a professional golf tournament for players aged 50 and above and the eighth British Senior Open Championship, held from 20 to 23 July at Royal Lytham & St Annes Golf Club in Lytham St Annes, Lancashire, England, United Kingdom.

In 2018, the tournament was, as all Senior British Open Championships played 1987–2002, retroactively recognized as a senior major golf championship and a PGA Tour Champions (at the time named the Senior PGA Tour) event.

Tom Wargo won by two strokes over defending champion Bob Charles and Doug Dalziel to win his first Senior British Open title and second senior major championship victory.

Venue

The event was the fourth Senior Open Championship in a row held at Royal Lytham & St Annes Golf Club.

Field
123 players entered the competition. Two of them withdraw and two were disqualified. 66 players, all of them professionals, no amateurs, made the 36-hole cut.

Past champions in the field
All five past Senior British Open champions participated. All of them made the 36-hole cut, Bob Charles (tied 2nd), Gary Player (tied 4th), Bobby Verway (tied 11th), John Fourie (tied 16th) and Neil Coles (tied 31st).

Past winners and runners-up at The Open Championship in the field 
The field included four former winners of The Open Championship. Three of them made the cut, Bob Charles (tied 2nd), Gary Player (tied 4th) and Arnold Palmer (tied 6th). Tony Jacklin was disqualified.

The field also included three former runners-up at The Open Championship; Brian Huggett (tied 4th), Christy O'Connor Snr (tied 11th) and Neil Coles (tied 31st).

Final results 
Sunday, 23 July 1994

Source:

References

External links 
 Results on European Tour website

Senior major golf championships
Golf tournaments in England
Senior British Open
Senior British Open
Senior British Open